The Apostolic Nunciature to Panama is an ecclesiastical office of the Catholic Church in Panama. It is a diplomatic post of the Holy See, whose representative is called the Apostolic Nuncio with the rank of an ambassador. The nuncio resides in Panama City.

List of papal representatives to Panama
Apostolic Internuncios to Central America 
Angelo Rotta (21 September 1923 – 6 June 1925)
Apostolic Nuncios
Carlo Chiarlo (30 September 1933 – 1940)
Luigi Centoz (3 December 1941 – 26 April 1952)
Paul Bernier (7 August 1952 – 9 September 1957)
Luigi Punzolo (12 December 1957 – 1961)
Antonino Pinci (31 October 1961 – 1971)
Edoardo Rovida (31 July 1971 – 13 August 1977)
Blasco Francisco Collaço (23 September 1977 – 26 July 1982)
José Sebastián Laboa Gallego (18 December 1982 – 21 August 1990)
Osvaldo Padilla (17 December 1990 – 1994)
Bruno Musarò (3 December 1994 – 25 September 1999)
Giacomo Guido Ottonello (29 November 1999 – 26 February 2005)
Giambattista Diquattro (2 April 2005 – 21 November 2008)
Andrés Carrascosa Coso (12 January 2009 – 22 June 2017)
Mirosław Adamczyk (12 August 2017 – 22 February 2020)
Luciano Russo (22 August 2020 – 18 December 2021)
Dagoberto Campos Salas (14 May 2022 – present)

References

 
Holy See
Panama
Diplomatic missions in Panama
Holy See–Panama relations